Wave Runner (stylized as WAVE RUNNER) is the fifteenth studio album by Japanese electronica band Capsule, released on February 18, 2015, by Warner Music Japan sublabel Unborde. The album debuted at the fifth spot of the Oricon Weekly Albums chart with 11,395 copies.

Background
The album was announced on August 9, 2014, at their performance in Rock in Japan Fes, as being due for release later that year. The duo performed songs from the album in October and November 2014. Some of the new songs were subjects of continuous rearrangements by Yasutaka Nakata from time to time, with the final versions included in the album. After several months with no further word of the album's release, Unborde announced on November 28, 2014 the album title, track list, cover and promotional photo.

An untitled song from the album, later revealed as "Feel Again", was used as a tie-up song to the illumination Christmas show project of Canal City Hakata.

A new version of the Appleseed Alpha movie theme song "Depth" with Toshiko Koshijima's vocals was included in the album.

Track listing
All songs written and produced by Yasutaka Nakata. All vocals (*) by Toshiko Koshijima.

Regular edition

Limited edition bonus disc

Deluxe Edition

Charts and certifications

Japanese charts

Sales and certifications

Release history

References

2015 albums
Capsule (band) albums
Albums produced by Yasutaka Nakata
Unborde albums
Warner Music Japan albums